José Sotero de Madrazo y Agudo (22 April 1781 – 8 May 1859) was a Spanish painter and engraver; one of the primary exponents of the Neoclassical style in Spain. He was the patriarch of a family of artists that included his sons Federico and Luis; and his grandsons, Raimundo and Ricardo.

Biography 
He was born in Santander, and began his studies at the Real Academia de Bellas Artes de San Fernando with Gregorio Ferro, a student of Anton Raphael Mengs. After 1803, he studied in Paris with Jacques-Louis David. Following David's advice, he applied for and received a government stipend to study in Rome.

In 1806 he went to Rome, where he completed his training at the Accademia di San Luca and studied Classical art. While there, he had some initial success with his rendering of the death of Viriatus. He also refused to take an oath of allegiance to the new government of King Joseph I. As a result, he and the other Spanish artists living in Rome were effectively held prisoner; first at the Castel Sant'Angelo, then at the Spanish Embassy. There, he got to know the exiled King Carlos IV and his wife, María Luisa de Borbón.

In 1809, he married Isabel Kuntze (?-1866), daughter of the late painter Tadeusz Kuntze, who was also staying in Rome. Four years later, King Carlos appointed him court painter; a largely honorary title, considering the circumstances, although he did produce numerous portraits. He lost this position in 1815 when the troops of Joachim Murat entered the Papal States in an effort to unify Italy under French control, prompting King Carlos to abandon his exile.

In 1818, after the Restoration, he returned to Madrid with his paintings. Once there, he occupied himself by arranging and cataloguing the collection at the newly established Real Museo de Pinturas y Esculturas (now the Museo del Prado), on behalf of King Fernando VII. The catalog included lithographs of the paintings, marking the first major use of this technique in Spain.

In 1823, he was named Director of the San Fernando academy and, in 1838, became Director of the Museo del Prado; a position he held until 1857 when he resigned in the face of some Royal criticism. He died in Madrid, aged 78, having amassed a large private art collection, which later passed into the hands of the Marqués de Salamanca and, after his death in 1883, became dispersed.<ref>The British Museum notes that according to a Sotheby sale catalogue (1869) of the Marquis of Salamanca (q.v.), the Salamanca collection was 'formed' by the eminent Spanish painter José de Madrazo y Agudo, but is unclear if this means he formerly owned the works or if he was the artistic adviser. See: José de Madrazo," [Biographical Notes,] Online</ref>

He focused on religious and historical themes and, together with José Aparicio, helped to established a movement devoted to patriotic art. His later works were often criticized for being emotionally cold and excessively grandiloquent.

The Madrazo family have been described as one of the most important painting dynasties in Spain, who literally dominated 19th-century painting in Spain. His sons were Federico de Madrazo, a painter; Luis de Madrazo, a painter; Pedro de Madrazo, an art critic and Juan de Madrazo, an architect; while his grandsons were Raimundo de Madrazo y Garreta, a painter and Ricardo de Madrazo, also a painter. His grand-daughter, Cecilia de Madrazo married the celebrated Orientalist artist, Mariano Fortuny.

References

 Further reading 
José Luis Diez, Catálogo de la exposición, "José de Madrazo", Museo Municipal de Madrid, Fundación Marcelino Botín, 1998 .
 María Ealo de Sá, José de Madrazo, primer pintor neoclásico de España, en su bicentenario, 1781-1759'', Ayuntamiento de Santander, 1981

External links 

1781 births
1859 deaths
People from Santander, Spain
Artists from Madrid
Artists from Cantabria
19th-century Spanish painters
19th-century male artists
Spanish male painters
Pupils of Jacques-Louis David
Directors of the Museo del Prado
History painters
Spanish portrait painters
Real Academia de Bellas Artes de San Fernando alumni
Spanish neoclassical painters